Benoit Parnaudeau (born 14 July 1972) is a Canadian-born French sailor.

Biography
He was born in Sherbrooke, Quebec, but grow up living in La Rochelle, and has a bachelor's degree in mathematics.

He has been heavily involved in the offshore scene before getting his break as a skipper as he prepared boats of Isabelle Autissier, Christophe Auguin, Didier Munduteguy and more.

He completed in the 2004-2005 Vendee Globe.

In 2005 he built a Class 40 for the Route du Rhum called Bio-Forer planning Gardens. He finished 14th in class.

Career highlights

Reference

1972 births
Living people
Canadian emigrants to France
French male sailors (sport)
IMOCA 60 class sailors
French Vendee Globe sailors
Canadian Vendee Globe sailors
2004 Vendee Globe sailors
Vendée Globe finishers
Single-handed circumnavigating sailors
Sportspeople from La Rochelle
Sportspeople from Sherbrooke